The Battle of Horseshoe Bend (also known as Tohopeka, Cholocco Litabixbee, or The Horseshoe), was fought during the War of 1812 in the Mississippi Territory, now central Alabama.  On March 27, 1814, United States forces and Indian allies under Major General Andrew Jackson defeated the Red Sticks, a part of the Creek Indian tribe who opposed American expansion, effectively ending the Creek War.

Background

The Creek Indians of Georgia and the eastern part of the Mississippi Territory had become divided into two factions: the Upper Creek (or Red Sticks), a majority who opposed American expansion and sided with the British and the colonial authorities of Spanish Florida during the War of 1812; and the Lower Creek, who were more assimilated into the Anglo culture, had a stronger relationship with the U.S. Indian Agent Benjamin Hawkins, and sought to remain on good terms with the Americans.

The Shawnee war leader Tecumseh visited Creek and other Southeast Indian towns in 1811–1812 to recruit warriors to join his war against American territorial encroachment. The Red Sticks, young men who wanted to revive traditional religious and cultural practices, were already forming, resisting assimilation.  They began to raid American frontier settlements.  When the Lower Creek helped U.S. forces to capture and punish leading raiders, the Lower Creek were punished in turn by the Red Sticks.

In 1813, militia troops intercepted a Red Stick party returning from obtaining arms in (Spanish colonial) Pensacola. While they were looting the material, the Red Sticks returned and defeated them, at what became known as the Battle of Burnt Corn. Red Sticks' raiding of enemy settlements continued; and in August 1813 they attacked an American outpost at Fort Mims.

After the Fort Mims massacre, frontier settlers appealed to the government for help. Since Federal military forces were committed to waging the War of 1812 against Great Britain, the governments of Tennessee, Georgia, and the Mississippi Territory organized militia forces, which together with Lower Creek and Cherokee allies, fought against the Red Sticks.

Jackson sent General John Coffee with the mounted infantry and the Indian allies south across the river to surround the Red Sticks' camp, while Jackson stayed with the rest of the 2,000 infantry north of the camp. Added to the militia units were the 39th United States Infantry and about 600 Cherokee, Choctaw, and Lower Creek, fighting against the Red Stick Creek warriors.

American Forces
West Tennessee Militia: Major General Andrew Jackson

Battle

On March 27, 1814, General Andrew Jackson led troops consisting of 2,700 American soldiers, 500 Cherokee, and 100 Lower Creek allies up a steep hill near Tehopeka.  From this vantage point, Jackson would begin his attack on the Red Stick fortification.  At 6:30am, he split his troops and sent roughly 1,300 men to cross the Tallapoosa River and surround the Creek village.  Then, at 10:30 a.m., Jackson's remaining troops began an artillery barrage which consisted of two cannons firing for about two hours. Little damage was caused to the Red Sticks or their 400-yard-long, log-and-dirt fortifications.  In fact, Jackson was quite impressed with the measures the Red Sticks took to protect their position. As he later wrote:

Soon, Jackson ordered a bayonet charge. The 39th U.S. Infantry, led by Colonel John Williams, charged the breastworks and engaged the Red Sticks in hand-to-hand combat. Sam Houston (the future statesman and leader of Texas) served as a third lieutenant in Jackson's army.  Houston was one of the first to make it over the log barricade alive and received a wound from a Creek arrow that troubled him for the rest of his life.

Meanwhile, the troops under the command of General John Coffee had successfully crossed the river and surrounded the encampment.  They joined the fight and gave Jackson a great advantage.  The Creek warriors refused to surrender, though, and the battle lasted for more than five hours.  At the end, roughly 800 of the 1,000 Red Stick warriors present at the battle were killed.  In contrast, Jackson lost fewer than 50 men during the fight and reported 154 wounded.

After the battle, Jackson's troops made bridle reins from skin taken from Indian corpses, conducted a body count by cutting off the tips of their noses, and sent their clothing as souvenirs to the "ladies of Tennessee."

Chief Menawa was severely wounded but survived; he led about 200 of the original 1,000 warriors across the river and toward safety, to join the Seminole tribe in Spanish Florida.

Results
On August 9, 1814, Andrew Jackson forced the Creek to sign the Treaty of Fort Jackson. The Creek Nation was forced to cede —half of central Alabama and part of southern Georgia—to the United States government; this included territory of the Lower Creek, who had been allies of the United States. Jackson had determined the areas from his sense of security needs. Of the  Jackson forced the Creek to cede , which was claimed by the Cherokee Nation, which had also allied with the United States. Jackson was promoted to Major General after getting agreement to the treaty.

Capture of Pensacola, Battle of New Orleans 
After the battle, Jackson sent his friend and trusted scout, John Gordon, Captain of the Spies, to secretly go to the Spanish fort at Pensacola to find out if the British were using it as a base to arm the rebellious red stick Creeks. Gordon travelled through hundreds of miles of hostile Creek territory to find the British flag flying at Pensacola and British officers arming and training Creeks. Jackson, with this knowledge, took Pensacola, a controversial move which led ultimately to further battle against the British in New Orleans.

This victory, along with that at the Battle of New Orleans, greatly contributed to Jackson's favorable national reputation and his popularity.  He was well known when he ran successfully for President in 1828.

Legacy
The battlefield is preserved in the Horseshoe Bend National Military Park.

Two currently active battalions of the Regular Army (2nd and 3rd Battalions of the 7th Infantry Regiment) perpetuate the lineage of the old 39th Infantry Regiment, which fought at the Battle of Horseshoe Bend.

In fiction
Eric Flint has written a series of alternate history novels, Trail of Glory, that begin with the Battle of Horseshoe Bend.  In Flint's version, Houston is only lightly wounded in the battle, allowing him freedom to develop his career, in turn facilitating the author's objectives.

The main character of Paulette Jiles' novel News of the World, 'Captain' Jefferson Kyle Kidd, has a backstory that includes fighting as a youth of 16 in this battle under Jackson.

Notes

References
Andrew Burstein, *
Steve Rajtar, Indian War Sites, (McFarland and Company, Inc., 1999)
Robert Remini, Andrew Jackson and the Course of American Empire, 1767-1821 (1977) ch. 13

Further reading
 Holland, James W. "Andrew Jackson and the Creek War: Victory at the Horseshoe Bend," Alabama Review, Oct 1968, Vol. 21 Issue 4, pp 243–275
 Kanon, Thomas. "A Slow, Laborious Slaughter": The Battle of Horseshoe Bend," Tennessee Historical Quarterly, March 1999, Vol. 58 Issue 1, pp 2–15
 Remini, Robert V. Andrew Jackson and His Indian Wars (2001), ch 4

External links

"The Battle of Horseshoe Bend: Collision of Cultures", National Park Service's Teaching with Historic Places.
A map of Creek War Battle Sites, PCL Map Collection at the University of Texas at Austin.
"Battle of Horseshoe Bend" ,  Encyclopedia of Alabama
Mrs. Dunham Rowland, "The Mississippi Territory in the War of 1812", Publications of the Mississippi Historical Society, Volume 4, 1921, pp. 7–156
"If you visited Horseshoe Bend Battlefield today"

Battles involving the Cherokee
Horseshoe Bend (1814)
1814 in the United States
Horseshoe Bend
Native American history of Alabama
Andrew Jackson
1814 in Mississippi Territory
March 1814 events